Scott Garland may refer to:

Scott Garland (attorney), Assistant US Attorney
Scott Garland (ice hockey), Canadian ice hockey player
Scott Garland (wrestler), American pro wrestler known as Scotty 2 Hotty